Kinnekulle Line is a  long unelectrified single track railway line from Håkantorp via Lidköping and Mariestad to Gårdsjö in Sweden. At Gårdsjö, it connects to the Western Main Line and at Håkantorp it connects with the Älvsborg Line. The line lacks both automatic train protection and centralized traffic control.
Västtrafik runs a regional trains service on the whole line, using Y31 trains. Green Cargo run trains from Hallsberg to a paper mill in Mariestad.

References

External links
Time table, select table number 63 

Railway lines in Sweden